Jordan Charney (born April 1, 1937) is an American character actor.

Many of his earliest roles were on daytime television, with appearances in numerous soaps. Jordan created the role of creepy Julian Dark in the early to mid-1960s on the CBS soap, The Secret Storm. He played Sam Lucas, a former convict who became a lawyer, in both Another World and its spin-off Somerset, playing the role from 1967 to 1974. He also appeared as Lt. Vince Wolek  on One Life to Live (1975–1977). Other roles were on Love of Life and All My Children.

Charney portrayed newspaper editor Ted Bergman in the 1977 CBS series The Andros Targets. In 1980, he played Capt. Roger Westerby, an old flame of Corabeth Godsey, in a season eight episode of The Waltons. He had a recurring role as Frank Angelino, Jack Tripper's boss, on Three's Company (1981–1983). He is often cast as a judge, attorney, prison warden, or police officer. He has made appearances on Falcon Crest, Dynasty, Night Court and 100 Centre Street, among many other series.  He can also be seen in the recurring role of Judge Donald Karan on Law & Order.

Charney has also appeared in such films as The Hospital, Network, and Ghostbusters, and can be heard in several episodes of the CBS Radio Mystery Theater.

Charney, who is married to television director Nancy Cooperstein, has appeared Off-Broadway with Sabine Singh in The Gold Standard by Daniel Roberts.

Selected filmography
Plaza Suite (1971) – Jesse's Aide (uncredited)
The Hospital (1971) – Hitchcock
Network (1976) – Harry Hunter
Those Lips, Those Eyes (1980)
Separate Ways (1981) – Harry Bartoff
Frances (1982) – Harold Clurman
Ghostbusters (1984) – Dean Yeager
Witches' Brew (1985) – Charlie Reynolds
Creator (1985) – Dr. Whitaker
My Little Girl (1986) – Dr. Gruner
Queenie in Love (2001) – Father
Mo (2007) – Dr. Leahman
Anamorph (2007) – Chairman (final film role)

References

External links

20th-century American male actors
21st-century American male actors
American male film actors
American male radio actors
American male soap opera actors
American male stage actors
American male television actors
Living people
Male actors from New York City
People from Brooklyn
1937 births